KRI dr. Wahidin Sudirohusodo (991) is a hospital ship of the Indonesian Navy. It is named after an Indonesian national hero Wahidin Soedirohoesodo. It was built in Indonesia by PT PAL.

Description

It has a length of 124 meters and a beam of 21.8 meter. The ship displacement is 7,290 tonnes. It has a capacity of 643 people, including 159 patients. It has a maximum speed of 18 knots, a cruising speed of 14 knots, and a economical speed of 12 knots. It can sail up to 30 days and 10,000 nautical miles.

History
The construction of the ship began with the first steel cutting ceremony on 9 July 2019, with the ship assigned with yard number of W000302. Its keel was laid on 14 October 2019. KRI dr. Wahidin Sudirohusodo was launched on 7 January 2021 at Semarang drydock in PT PAL shipyard, Surabaya. Along with KRI Golok (688), the ship was commissioned on 14 January 2022 at Surabaya, with its first commander being Sea Colonel Anton Pratomo.

References 

Sudirohusodo-class hospital ships
Ships built in Indonesia
2021 ships